Fatty-replaced breast tissue is a term used in mammography that refers to the replacement of breast tissue with fatty tissue. This commonly occurs as a woman ages.

References

External links 
 Fatty-replaced breast tissue entry in the public domain NCI Dictionary of Cancer Terms

Breast